The Hong Kong national under-16 basketball team is a national basketball team of Hong Kong, governed by the China Hong Kong Basketball Association.
It represents the country in international under-16 (under age 16) basketball competitions.

See also 
 Hong Kong men's national basketball team
 Hong Kong men's national under-18 basketball team
 Hong Kong women's national under-16 basketball team

References

External links 
 Archived records of Hong Kong team participations

Basketball teams in Hong Kong
Men's national under-16 basketball teams
Basketball